Matinkylä (Finnish) or Mattby (Swedish)  is an underground station of the western metro extension (Länsimetro) of the Helsinki Metro. It is located at the southern end of Iso Omena shopping centre. 3 December 2022, the extension from Matinkylä to Kivenlahti opened as part of the second phase of the Länsimetro. The station serves up to 30,000 people on weekdays. It is located 1,6 kilometres east from Finnoo metro station and 1,9 kilometres west from Niittykumpu metro station.

References

External links
Länsimetro work in progress

Helsinki Metro stations
2017 establishments in Finland